The black-collared bulbul (Neolestes torquatus), or black-collared greenbul, is a species of songbird in the bulbul family, Pycnonotidae. It is monotypic within the genus Neolestes. For many years, some authorities considered the genus to belong to the bushshrike or shrike families due to shape and plumage similarities until a review of molecular genetic relationships in 1999 confirmed the behavioural and morphological affinities to Pycnonotidae.
The black-collared bulbul is found in equatorial Africa in its natural habitat of dry savanna.

References

External links
Image at ADW 

black-collared bulbul
Birds of Central Africa
black-collared bulbul
Taxonomy articles created by Polbot